Lac de Villefort is a lake in Lozère, France. At an elevation of 580 m, its surface area is 1.27 km².

Villefort